Pastor or Pastore is an occupational surname for the profession of a religious (usually Christian) pastor and the profession of a shepherd pastor. Notable people with the surname include:

Ada I. Pastore (1906–1952), Argentine botanist
Affonso Celso Pastore (born 1939), Brazilian economist; past president of the Brazilian Central Bank
Amy Wynn Pastor (born 1976), American reality show performer
Annalisa Pastore, Professor of Chemistry and Molecular Biology at King's College London
Aurelio Pastor (contemporary), Peruvian politician and congressman
Donna Pastore (contemporary), American professor; past president of the National Association for Girls and Women in Sport
Ed Pastor (1943–2018), American politician from Arizona; U.S. representative
Ernesto Pastor (1892–1921), Puerto Rican bullfighter
Facundo Pastor, Argentine radio journalist
Felice Pastore (1786–1862), Italian nobleman
Frank Pastor (born 1957), (East) German footballer
Frank Pastore (born 1957), American professional baseball player
George Pastor (born 1963), American professional soccer player
Gildo Pastor (1910–1990), Monegasque businessman and property developer.
Gildo Pallanca Pastor (born 1967), Monegasque businessman, CEO and owner of Venturi Automobiles
Hélène Pastor (1937–2014), heiress and businesswoman from Monaco.
Javier Pastore (born 1989), Argentine professional association football player
John O. Pastore (1907–2000), American politician from Rhode Island; U.S. Senator 1950–76; close friend to John F. Kennedy
Louis Pastore (1931-2020), American politician
Lubos Pastor, Slovakian-American economist
Ludwig von Pastor (1854–1928), German historian and diplomat for Austria
Manuel Rivas Pastor (born 1960), Spanish chess grandmaster
Mauro Pastore (born 1967), Italian designer
Michel Pastor (1944–2014), businessman and art collector from Monaco.
Nick Pastore (contemporary), American law enforcement officer from New Haven, Connecticut
Paco Cabanes Pastor (1954–2021), Spanish professional Valencian pilota player
Robert Pastor (born 1947), American scholar; national security adviser to President Jimmy Carter
Rodrigo Pastore (born 1972), Argentine basketball coach and former player
Rosana Pastor (born 1960), Spanish actress
Thierry Pastor (born 1960), French singer
Tony Pastor (bandleader) (1907–1969), Italian-American singer and saxophonist
Tony Pastor (1837–1908), American impresario, variety performer and theatre owner
Toon Pastor (born 1929), Netherlands Olympic boxer
Vincent Pastore (born 1946), American film and television actor

Occupational surnames
English-language surnames
Italian-language surnames
Spanish-language surnames
German-language surnames
English-language occupational surnames